In enzymology, a zeatin reductase is an enzyme that catalyzes the chemical reaction

dihydrozeatin + NADP+  zeatin + NADPH + H+

Thus, the two substrates of this enzyme are dihydrozeatin and NADP+, whereas its 3 products are zeatin, NADPH, and H+.

This enzyme belongs to the family of oxidoreductases, specifically those acting on the CH-CH group of donor with NAD+ or NADP+ as acceptor.  The systematic name of this enzyme class is dihydrozeatin:NADP+ oxidoreductase.

References

 

EC 1.3.1
NADPH-dependent enzymes
Enzymes of unknown structure